Hulunbuir or Hulun Buir (Kölün buyir, Mongolian Cyrillic: Хөлөнбуйр, Khölönbuir; , Hūlúnbèi'ěr) is a region that is governed as a prefecture-level city in northeastern Inner Mongolia, China. Its administrative center is located at Hailar District, its largest urban area. Major scenic features are the high steppes of the Hulun Buir grasslands, the Hulun and Buir lakes (the latter partially in Mongolia), and the Khingan range. Hulun Buir borders Russia to the north and west, Mongolia to the south and west, Heilongjiang province to the east and Hinggan League to the direct south. Hulunbuir is a linguistically diverse area: next to Mandarin Chinese, Mongolian dialects such as Khorchin and Buryat, the Mongolic language Daur, and some Tungusic languages, including Oroqen and Solon, are spoken there.

History
During the Qing Dynasty (1644–1912), Hulunbuir was part of Heilongjiang province. The 1858 Treaty of Aigun established today's approximate Sino-Russian border, at a great loss to Heilongjiang's territory. In 1901, the Chinese Eastern Railway linked Hulunbuir to the rest of northeast China and to Russian Far East. From 1912 to 1949, during the Republic of China (ROC) period, Hulunbuir was part of Xing'an and Heilongjiang provinces. In winter 1912, the Barga Mongol people of Hulunbuir expelled the Chinese troops and administration and proclaimed the independence of Barga (Hulunbuir); afterwards they declared allegiance to the Bogdo Khan of Mongolia; an agreement between the Russian Empire and the ROC on November 6/October 24, 1915 designated Hulunbuir a "special" region under direct subordination to the Central Government of China, but in practice Russia had partial control over day-to-day administration and economy. In 1929, the Soviet Union broke this agreement and invaded Hulunbuir. After the Japanese invasion of China, Hulunbuir became part of the Japanese puppet state Manchukuo, which was not recognized by the Chinese. In the Chinese Civil War, the Communist Party of China gained the support of Inner Mongol leaders like Ulanhu by promising the irredentist expansion of Inner Mongolia into areas that had majorities of Han and Manchu peoples.

After the 1949 Communist revolution, Hulunbuir was annexed into Inner Mongolia, but the region kept economic ties to the rest of the northeast via the Chinese Eastern Railway. During the Cultural Revolution, the parts of historical Manchuria inside Inner Mongolia were briefly restored to their original provinces; Hulunbuir was given back to Heilongjiang from 1969 to 1979. Until October 10, 2001, Hulunbuir was administered as a League. The jurisdiction area of the city is larger than all but 8 Chinese province-level divisions (and 42 U.S. states), although the actual urban agglomeration is just a very small part of the region, and the average population density of the area is very low.

Names

The city was once a league of Inner Mongolia, until 10 October 2001. During the Qing Dynasty, it was known in Mandarin as Hūlúnbùyǔ'ěr.

Administrative subdivisions
Hulunbuir is divided into 13 different county-level jurisdictions: one district, five county-level cities, four banners and three autonomous banners.

Geography and climate

Hulunbuir itself (Hailar) has a humid continental climate (Köppen Dwb). Winters are long, very dry and severe, due to the semi−permanent Siberian High, while summers are short, though very warm, and rather wet, due to the East Asian monsoon. With at least 55% of possible sunshine in all months and an annual total greater than 2,700 hours, sunny weather dominates year-round. Approximately 70% of the annual rainfall occurs during the three summer months.

Demographics

Transport
Airports include:
 Hulunbuir Hailar Airport - Hailar
 Zhalantun Chengjisihan Airport - Zhalantun
 Xinbarag Youqi Baogede Airport - New Barag Right Banner

References

Further reading

, -4033.
Bökecilagu. Kölün Boyir-un sonirqal-ud. Qayilar : Ȯbȯr Mongġol-un Soyol-un Keblel-u̇n Qoriy-a, 1988. 2, 8, 217 p. .
Möngkedalai. Hulunbeier samanjiao yu lamajiao shilüe = Kölün Boyir-un böge-yin śasin kiged lama-yin śasin-u tobci teüke. Beijing : Minzu chubanshe, 2014. 5, 4, 545 p., ill., biblio., index. .

External links

Hulunbuir government website (in Chinese)
Inner Mongolian postcodes (in English)

See also
Hulun (alliance)

 
Cities in Inner Mongolia
Prefecture-level divisions of Inner Mongolia
National Forest Cities in China